The Phoenician Sphinx inscription, also known as the Abdadoni inscription is an inscription found at Umm al-Amad, Lebanon.

The inscription is written on the socle of a statue of a couching sphinx, with only the feet and ankles still attached. The body of the sphinx was found lying next to it, but the head was not found. The inscription stated that the statue was dedicated to Milk'ashtart El - Hammon.

It was found to the right of an entrance to one of the buildings on the east side, at the edge of the street. It was one of a number of sphinx fragments found at the site.
It is thought that the entrance to the temple complex was flanked by two such sphinx statues.

It is currently in the National Museum of Beirut.

It was first published in 1962 by Maurice Dunand and Raymond Duru, although likely discovered previously.

Bibliography

 
 Krahmalkov, Charles. “NOTES ON THE INSCRIPTION OF ’BD’DNY FROM UMM EL-’AMED.” Rivista Degli Studi Orientali 46, no. 1/2 (1971): 33–37. http://www.jstor.org/stable/41880192.
 A. Caquot. "Le dieu Mikastart et les inscriptions d'Oum el-Ahmed", Semitica, XV, 1965

References

1962 archaeological discoveries
Phoenician inscriptions
Sphinxes
Phoenician sculpture
Archaeological artifacts
Collections of the National Museum of Beirut

he:כתובות חמון#כתובת עבדאדני